Khaled Belaid Abumdas (born 20 January 1987), also spelled Khalid, is a Libyan former professional snooker player. He is the first professional snooker player from Libya, competing on the main tour between 2013 and 2015.

Career
Abumdas won a place on the main tour for the 2013–14 and 2014–15 seasons after finishing runner up to Peter Francisco in the 2013 ABSF African Snooker Championship. However, his opening season started late in November due to visa issues and he lost all of his five matches winning only five frames, with his best result being a 5–2 defeat to former top 16 player Ryan Day in the qualifying rounds for the 2014 China Open. He finished the season ranked last at 131st in the world.

Abumdas did not enter any tournaments of the 2014–15 season and dropped off the tour.

Performance and rankings timeline

References

External links
 
 Khalid Belaied Abumdas at Snooker.org

Libyan snooker players
Place of birth missing (living people)
1987 births
Living people